The Abokouamekro Game Reserve is a protected area located in Côte d'Ivoire. It was established in 1993.

The reserve was created in 1986 and is home to many wild animals that have been considered extinct in the Ivory Coast for several decades. 

Poaching continues to pose a threat to the park's ecosystem.

References

Protected areas of Ivory Coast
Game reserves